Spergo aithorrhis is a species of sea snail, a marine gastropod mollusk in the family Raphitomidae.

Description
The length of the shell reaches 120 mm.

Distribution
This marine species occurs off the Philippines, the Norfolk Ridge and New Caledonia

References

 Sysoev, A. & Bouchet, P., 2001. New and uncommon turriform gastropods (Gastropoda: Conoidea) from the south-west Pacific. Mémoires du Muséum national d'Histoire naturelle 185: 271-320

External links
 
 MNHN, Paris: holotype
 Criscione, F.; Hallan, A.; Fedosov, A.; Puillandre, N. (2021). Deep Downunder: Integrative taxonomy of Austrobela, Spergo, Theta and Austrotheta (Gastropoda: Conoidea: Raphitomidae) from the deep sea of Australia. Journal of Zoological Systematics and Evolutionary Research. DOI 10.1111/jzs.12512.

aithorrhis
Gastropods described in 2001